Meghan Heffern (born October 3, 1983) is a Canadian actress. She was born in Edmonton, Alberta, and lives in Toronto, Ontario.

Filmography

Film

Television

References

External links

1983 births
Actresses from Edmonton
Canadian film actresses
Canadian television actresses
Living people
21st-century Canadian actresses
Canadian web series actresses